The Aristocrats is the debut album of rock trio The Aristocrats, released on September 13, 2011.

Track listing

Personnel
Guthrie Govan - guitar
Bryan Beller - bass
Marco Minnemann - drums

References

2011 debut albums
The Aristocrats (band) albums